Carolyn Mae "Carol" Jantsch (born on March 8, 1985) is an American tuba player.  She is the daughter of a medical doctor and a Kenyon College vocal-music teacher, Nancy Jantsch.  She began to study piano at age 6, and the euphonium at age 9.  She took up the tuba in seventh grade.

Life and career
Jantsch graduated from Interlochen Arts Academy boarding high school in 2002, and is a 2006 graduate of the University of Michigan. While attending university, Jantsch auditioned for the New York Philharmonic and The Philadelphia Orchestra. She was a semi-finalist for the New York tuba position. She won the Philadelphia position of Principal Tuba in February 2006, appointed by music director Christoph Eschenbach. She assumed the chair, full-time, with the 2006–2007 concert season. Jantsch is the youngest member of the Orchestra and is, according to National Public Radio, the first woman to hold a Principal Tuba chair among major orchestras in the United States.

In addition to the Orchestra, Ms. Jantsch also teaches at Yale School of Music.

Jantsch is also a noted Ultimate frisbee player, and won a tuba throwing competition.

Awards and solo competitions
She has won:
 Potomac Festivals Tuba Artist Competition in 2005
 Leonard Falcone International Euphonium and Tuba Competition
 International Instrumental Competition Markneukirchen in Germany
 Arts Recognition Talent Search
 Young Artist Award from Interlochen Arts Academy
 Columbus Symphony Orchestra Young Musician's Competition
 Student Tuba at the Leonard Falcone International Euphonium and Tuba Competition
 Arnold Jacobs Mock Orchestral Tuba Competition  (Arnold Jacobs was the principal tubist for the Chicago Orchestra for 44 years, 1944 to 1988)
 A Scholarship from the Music for Youth Foundation

Discography
 Cascades (2009) - Carol Jantsch, tuba, Susan Nowicki, piano

References

External links 
 Interview with Carol Jantsch, Tuba News website, 28 September 2004.
 Website
 Philadelphia Orchestra bio

1985 births
Living people
American classical tubists
Women tubists
Interlochen Center for the Arts alumni
University of Michigan alumni
21st-century American musicians
21st-century American women musicians
21st-century tubists
Musicians of the Philadelphia Orchestra